Ateet is a 2020 Hindi-language film starring Priyamani which streams on ZEE5. It is a story of a soldier who was lost in a war and declared dead, after several years he returns to his family, now a question occurs whether he is alive or dead.

Plot 
The story is about Captain Ateet Rana who was declared killed in action, Vishwa Karma his senior decides to take care of his wife Janvi and daughter Sana. After 10 years of hiding details about Ateet from Sana, in a twist of fate Ateet Rana returns and wants his family back and is ready to expose a dark truth about his senior Vishwa Karma.

Cast
 Priyamani as Janvi
 Sanjay Suri as Vishwa Karma
 Rajeev Khandelwal as Ateet Rana 
 Vipin Sharma as Dr. Masood

Soundtrack
The soundtrack is produced by Harish Sagne.

The film contains singers like Sonu Nigam Yamini Sri Devi Yasser Desai and Sonu Kakkar

References 

2020s Hindi-language films
ZEE5 original films